Bror Österdahl (6 February 1900 – 25 April 1973) was a Swedish sprinter. He competed in the men's 100 metres and the 4x100 metres relay events at the 1924 Summer Olympics.

References

External links
 

1900 births
1973 deaths
Athletes (track and field) at the 1924 Summer Olympics
Swedish male sprinters
Olympic athletes of Sweden
Athletes from Stockholm